Krivosheinsky (masculine), Krivosheinskaya (feminine), or Krivosheinskoye (neuter) may refer to:
Krivosheinsky District, a district of Tomsk Oblast, Russia
Krivosheinskaya, a rural locality (a village) in Vologda Oblast, Russia

See also
Krivosheino